Daniel Cotton (born 8 April 1988) in Peterborough, England and is a former professional footballer at Boston United, who plays for Cambridge City F.C. in the Northern Premier League Midlands Division.

Career
A right-sided winger, Cotton signed for Boston United on 6 October 2006 from hometown club Blackstones, after impressing manager Steve Evans in a pre-season friendly game against the Pilgrims. He made his debut against Bristol Rovers the following day, coming on as a substitute in the second half. Ten days later he started the Football League Trophy match against Brighton & Hove Albion
However, he made only one more appearance as a substitute on 28 October before leaving the club in January 2007, after which he rejoined Blackstones.

He subsequently joined Stamford in 2008, playing in the Evo Stick Division One South scoring 50 goals for the club. He then had a short spell at  Soham Town Rangers playing in the Ryman Division One League. The following season, he joined Spalding United and won the United Counties Premier Division along with the League Cup. In 2014, he made the move to fellow United Counties Premier Division side Yaxley FC winning the league title in 2017/18 and securing promotion to the Bet Victor Southern League Central Division. After 8 years with Yaxley FC in 2022 he signed for fellow Northern Premier Midlands Division side Cambridge City FC.

References

External links

Living people
1988 births
People from Stamford, Lincolnshire
English footballers
Blackstones F.C. players
Boston United F.C. players
Spalding United F.C. players
Soham Town Rangers F.C. players
Stamford A.F.C. players
Yaxley F.C. players
Association football midfielders